Tasamul Haque (born 2 October 1991) is a Bangladeshi cricketer who has played first-class cricket since 2011.

References

External links

1991 births
Living people
Bangladeshi cricketers
Sylhet Division cricketers
Chittagong Division cricketers
Dhaka Metropolis cricketers
Kala Bagan Krira Chakra cricketers
Bangladesh East Zone cricketers
Cricketers from Dhaka